Elections to Stockport Metropolitan Borough Council were held on 3 May 2007. One third of the council was up for election. The Liberal Democrats retained overall control of the council with a majority of 9 councillors. The overall turnout was 36.7%.

Following the election, the make up of the council was as follows;

Ward results

Bramhall North ward

Bramhall South ward

Bredbury and Woodley ward

Bredbury Green and Romiley ward

Brinnington and Central ward

Cheadle and Gatley ward

Cheadle Hulme North ward

Cheadle Hulme South ward

Davenport and Cale Green ward

Edgeley and Cheadle Heath ward

Hazel Grove ward

Heald Green ward

Heatons North ward

Heatons South ward

Manor ward

Marple North ward

Marple South ward

Offerton ward

Reddish North ward

Reddish South ward

Stepping Hill ward

References

2007
2007 English local elections
2000s in Greater Manchester